The 1932 Troy State Red Wave football team represented Troy State Teachers College (now known as Troy University) as an independent during the 1932 college football season. Led by second-year head coach Albert Elmore, the Red Wave compiled an overall record of 5–3–2.

Schedule

References

Troy State
Troy Trojans football seasons
Troy State Red Wave football